Anthony Willis Richards (6 March 1934 – 4 March 2010) was an English footballer who played as a forward.

Associated with Birmingham City as a teenager, he joined Walsall in 1954. He became the club's top scorer for five successive seasons, firing the "Saddlers" to two successive promotions from the Fourth Division into the Second Division in 1959–60 and 1960–61. After 185 goals in 334 league games for the club, he was sold on to Port Vale for £9,000 in March 1963. Twice becoming the club's top scorer, a series of injuries brought his career to a close, and he moved into non-league football in May 1966 with Nuneaton Borough and Dudley Town.

Career
Richards was in the Army from 1952 to his demobbing in 1954, playing football (as captain) for the Battery and Regimental team whilst serving in Egypt.

Richards started his career with Birmingham City, but did not make a league appearance for the club before joining Walsall in 1954. Walsall finished 23rd in the 24 team Third Division South in 1954–55 under the stewardship of Frank Buckley, and were forced to apply for re-election. They rose to 20th in 1955–56 under John Love, and then 15th in 1956–57. Richards came to prominence after Bill Moore was appointed manager, and finished as the club's top scorer in 1957–58 with 20 goals, as a 20th-place finish meant that Walsall became founder members of the Fourth Division. He scored 28 goals in 1958–59, as his team posted a sixth-place finish, two places and six points behind promoted Shrewsbury Town. His 26 goals in 1959–60 helped to fire Walsall to the top of the table, a clear five points ahead of second place Notts County. He was the highest goal scorer in the Third Division in 1960–61 with 36 goals, as he fired the "Saddlers" to a second successive promotion as runners-up, six points behind champions Bury. His 20 goals in 1961–62 helped to secure the club's place in the Second Division. However they were relegated in 1962–63, as for the first time in six seasons Richards was not the club's top goalscorer. In his nine years at Fellows Park, Richards scored 185 goals in 334 league games, and became the club's second-highest goal scorer. In one memorable game against Bournemouth and Boscombe Athletic he scored a penalty and then saved a penalty after an injury to his goalkeeper.

He joined Freddie Steele's Port Vale for £9,000 in March 1963. Amazingly, with 13 goals in 14 games in the 1962–63 season he had become the club's top scorer despite only playing for three months of the season. The following season, with nine months to play in, a leg injury Richards suffered in September meant he was only able to re-create his previous season's record; scoring 13 goals in 34 games, once more becoming the club's top scorer. He hit a hat-trick against Bristol City in a 4–1 win at Vale Park on 31 August 1963. However he began to be plagued by injuries at Vale, missing the start of the 1964–65 relegation season after suffering the effects of an insect bite. In September 1964 he sustained a cartilage injury that required surgery. He scored five goals in 20 appearances in 1965–66, but he never really recovered after his operation, and was given a free transfer by manager Jackie Mudie in May 1966. He finished his career with non-league clubs Nuneaton Borough and Dudley Town.

Before he died, Richards was appointed an Honorary Life President of Walsall, to mark his contribution to the club and his cult status amongst the club's fans. Richards died on 4 March 2010, two days before what would have been his 76th birthday. A minute's silence was held before Walsall's 2–2 draw with Millwall on 7 March as a tribute to Richards and Macclesfield Town manager Keith Alexander, who had died on 3 March.

Career statistics

Honours
Walsall
 Football League Fourth Division: 1959–60
 Football League Third Division second-place promotion: 1960–61

References

1934 births
2010 deaths
Footballers from Birmingham, West Midlands
English footballers
Association football forwards
Birmingham City F.C. players
Walsall F.C. players
Port Vale F.C. players
Nuneaton Borough F.C. players
Dudley Town F.C. players
English Football League players
Southern Football League players
Royal Artillery soldiers
Outfield association footballers who played in goal